Omentopexy is a surgical procedure whereby the greater omentum is sutured to a nearby organ. Suture to the abdominal wall is used to induce circulation away from portal circulation into caval circulation. It may also be sutured to another organ to increase arterial circulation.

References

 The Annals of Thoracic Surgery
 The Journal of Thoracic and Cardiovascular Surgery
 The Journal of Thoracic and Cardiovascular Surgery
 The Annals of Thoracic Surgery
 The Journal of Thoracic and Cardiovascular Surgery
 Farm Animal Surgery

Digestive system surgery